Lenartov is a village and municipality in Bardejov District in the Prešov Region of north-east Slovakia.

History
In historical records the village was first mentioned in 1543.

Geography
The municipality lies at an altitude of 475 metres and covers an area of 14.777 km².
It has a population of about 990 people.

External links
 
 
https://web.archive.org/web/20080111223415/http://www.statistics.sk/mosmis/eng/run.html

External links
https://web.archive.org/web/20080111223415/http://www.statistics.sk/mosmis/eng/run.html

Villages and municipalities in Bardejov District
Šariš
Romani communities in Slovakia